Vusal Asgarov (born 23 August 2001) is an Azerbaijani footballer who plays as a midfielder for Neftçi Baku in the Azerbaijan Premier League.

Club career
On 08 May 2021, Asgarov made his debut in the Azerbaijan Premier League for Neftçi Baku match against Sabail.

References

External links
 

2001 births
Living people
Association football midfielders
Azerbaijani footballers
Azerbaijan youth international footballers
Azerbaijan Premier League players
Neftçi PFK players